Giovanni Battista Magni, also known as il Modenino, (1592 – 1674) was an Italian painter of the Baroque period, active in Rome.

References

1592 births
1674 deaths
Painters from Modena
17th-century Italian painters
Italian male painters
Italian Baroque painters